This is a list of Bosniak composers, musical groups, musicians and singers:

Composers
Alexander von Zemlinsky (1871–1942), Austrian composer and conductor who had a Bosniak maternal grandmother
Dino Zonić, composer and conductor
Ismet Alajbegović Šerbo (1925–1987), composer, songwriter and accordionist

Genre

Opera
Jasmin Bašić (born 1971
Aida Čorbadžić (born 1976)
Bahrija Nuri Hadžić (1904–1993)

Pop

Anabela Atijas (born 1975), father was a Bosniak
Adnan Babajić (born 1988)
Alma Čardžić (born 1968)
Amila Glamočak (born 1966)
Dalal Midhat-Talakić (born 1981)
Danijel Alibabić, Montenegrin singer with a Bosniak father
Deen (born 1982)
Denial Ahmetović (born 1995)
Dino Merlin (born 1962)
Donna Ares (1977–2017)
Dženy (born 1987)
Eldin Huseinbegović (born 1978)
Elvir Mekić (born 1981)
Emina Jahović (born 1982)
Fazla (born 1967)
Kemal Monteno (1948–2015)
Lepa Brena (born 1960)
Maya Sar (born 1981)
Marija Šerifović (born 1984), has Bosniak ancestry through her father
Mirza Šoljanin (born 1985)
Nino Pršeš
Peter Nalitch (born 1981), Russian singer whose grandfather was a Bosniak
Rialda (born 1992)
Sabahudin Kurt (1935–2018)
Seka Aleksić (born 1981), mother was a Bosniak
Selma Bajrami (born 1980), mother was a Bosniak
Selma Muhedinović (born 1972)
Senidah (born 1985), Slovenian singer whose parents were Bosniaks
Zuzi Zu (born 1978)

Rock

Alen Islamović (born 1957)
Branko Đurić (born 1962), mother was a Bosniak
Cem Adrian (born 1980), Turkish singer of Bosniak ancestry
Elvir Laković Laka (born 1969)
Hari Varešanović (born 1961)
Sead Lipovača (born 1955)
Seid Memić (born 1950)

Rap
Buba Corelli (born 1989)
Edo Maajka (born 1978)
Frenkie (born 1982)
Jala Brat (born 1986)

Sevdalinka

Beba Selimović (1936–2020)
Damir Imamović (born 1978)
Dina Bajraktarević (born 1953)
Emina Zečaj (1929–2020)
Hanka Paldum (born 1956)
Himzo Polovina (1927–1986), father was a Bosniak
Meho Puzić (1937–2007)
Mirsada Bajraktarević (1951–1976)
Rešad Bešlagić (1912–1945)
Safet Isović (1936–2007)
Silvana Armenulić (1938–1976)
Umihana Čuvidina (1794–1870)
Zaim Imamović (1920–1994)
Zehra Deović (1938–2015)
Zekerijah Đezić (1937–2002)

Folk

Al' Dino (born 1970), singer-songwriter and composer
Asim Brkan (born 1954)
Elma Sinanović (born 1974)
Elvidin Krilić (born 1962)
Elvira Rahić (born 1975)
Enes Begović (born 1965)
Esad Plavi (born 1965)
Halid Bešlić (born 1953)
Halid Muslimović (born 1960)
Haris Džinović (born 1951)
Jasmin Muharemović (born 1965)
Kemal Malovčić (born 1946)
Osman Hadžić (born 1966)
Nihad Alibegović (born 1962)
Nino Rešić (1964–2007)
Sanela Sijerčić
Šaban Šaulić (1951–2019)
Šako Polumenta (born 1960)
Šemsa Suljaković (born 1951)
Šerif Konjević (born 1957)

Guitarist
Denis Azabagić (born 1972), classical guitarist

Lutenist
Edin Karamazov (born 1965)

Songwriters
Edo Mulahalilović (1964–2010)
Fahrudin Pecikoza (born 1962)
Faruk Buljubašić

Trumpeter
Izudin Čavrković (1941–2007)

See also
List of Bosniaks
List of Bosniak writers

References

External links

Music
Music
 
Bosniak music